UFC on Fox: Henderson vs. Thomson (also known as UFC on Fox 10) was a mixed martial arts event held on January 25, 2014, at the United Center in Chicago, Illinois.

Background
A lightweight bout between former WEC and UFC Lightweight Champion Benson Henderson and former Strikeforce Lightweight Champion Josh Thomson headlined the event.

Jared Rosholt was expected to face promotional newcomer Aleksei Oleinik at the event. However, Oleinik was forced out of the bout with an injury and Rosholt was pulled from the card altogether.

Pascal Krauss and Adam Khaliev were expected to fight at this event. However, both were forced off the card due to undisclosed circumstances.

UFC on FOX 10 had 2.55 million viewers, which was up from 2.44 million for UFC on FOX 9.

Results

Bonus awards
The following fighters were awarded $50,000 bonuses.

 Fight of the Night: Alex Caceres vs. Sergio Pettis
 Knockout of the Night: Donald Cerrone
 Submission of the Night: Alex Caceres

See also
List of UFC events
2014 in UFC

References

Fox UFC
Events in Chicago
2014 in mixed martial arts
Mixed martial arts in Chicago
Sports competitions in Chicago
2014 in sports in Illinois
2010s in Chicago
2014 in Illinois
January 2014 sports events in the United States